Nicole Broch Estrup (born 14 May 1993) is a Danish professional golfer who plays on the Ladies European Tour (LET).

Broch Estrup won her first LET event at the 2015 Helsingborg Open.

Broch Estrup was the 2015 LET Player of the Year.

She gained an LPGA Tour card for 2017 via the LPGA Final Qualifying Tournament.

Professional wins

Ladies European Tour wins
2015 Helsingborg Open

Symetra Tour wins
2016 Symetra Tour Championship

LET Access Series
2013 HLR Golf Academy Open, Ladies Norwegian Challenge

Team appearances
Amateur
European Ladies' Team Championship (representing Denmark): 2009, 2011, 2013
Espirito Santo Trophy (representing Denmark): 2012
Vagliano Trophy (representing the Continent of Europe): 2013 (winners)

References

External links

Danish female golfers
Ladies European Tour golfers
LPGA Tour golfers
Olympic golfers of Denmark
Golfers at the 2016 Summer Olympics
Sportspeople from the Capital Region of Denmark
People from Hillerød Municipality
1993 births
Living people